Centreville Academy is a private PK-12 school in Centreville, Mississippi. It serves 357 students from  Amite County and adjacent Wilkinson County.

History

At the end of the 1950s, as part of the Massive resistance to the desegregation of the educational system ordered by the Supreme Court in Brown v. Board of Education many white students were enrolled in newly-established  segregation academies which included Centreville Academy.  As segregation faded in popularity most of these institutions changed their openly discriminatory policies and in 2016, the school had one black student.

Athletics
The school offers the following sports:
 Football — MAIS class AA champions in 1976, 1979, 1989, 1991, 1998, 1999, 2007, and 2008 under Bill Hurst, who has been coach at Centreville for more than forty years.
Softball
Cross County
Basketball
Baseball
Tennis
Golf
 Archery

Alumni
Matt Tolbert - baseball player

References

Private middle schools in Mississippi
Private high schools in Mississippi
Private elementary schools in Mississippi
Schools in Amite County, Mississippi
Segregation academies in Mississippi
Educational institutions established in 1970